This is a list of the 99 members of the European Parliament for Germany in the 2009 to 2014 session.

List

Party representation

2009
List
Germany